Burmese names lack the serial structure of most Western names. The Burmans have no customary matronymic or patronymic system and thus there is no surname at all. In the culture of Myanmar, people can change their name at will, often with no government oversight, to reflect a change in the course of their lives. Also, many Burmese names use an honorific, given at some point in life, as an integral part of the name.

Traditional and Western-style names
Burmese names were originally one syllable, as in the cases of U Nu and U Thant ("U" being an honorific). In the mid-20th century, many Burmese started using two syllables, albeit without any formal structure. In the late 1890s, British scholars observed that Rakhines commonly adopted three-syllable names whereas Burmans were still using one or two at most. As they become more familiar with Western culture, Burmese people are gradually increasing the number of syllables in their children's names, by use of various structures. Today, names with up to four syllables are common for men and up to five for women.

Scholars such as Thant Myint-U have argued that the rise of complex Burmese personal names resulted from the collapse of the Burmese monarchy, which ended the sophisticated system of Pali-Burmese styles, crown service and gentry titles, leaving the majority of Burmese with single-syllable names. Former titles, such as min ("leader") were re-appropriated as part of personal names.

For example, Burmese nationalist Aung San's parents were named Pha and Suu, both of which are single-syllable names. His birth name was Htain Lin, but he changed his name to Aung San later in life. His child is named Aung San Suu Kyi. The first part of her name, "Aung San", is from her father's name at the time of her birth. "Suu" comes from her grandmother. "Kyi" comes from her mother, Khin Kyi. The addition of the father or mother's name in a person's name is now quite frequent, although it does not denote the development of a family name. Other nomenclature systems are used as well.

The use of the names of one's parents and relatives in personal names , although it differs from historical Western practices.

Burman names commonly include Pali-derived words combined with native Burmese words, including:

Female:
sanda ( "moon", from canda)
thanda ( "coral", from santa)
thiri ( "splendour", from siri)
hayma ("forest", compare Himalayas)
Male:
thura ( "brave, gallant" from sūra)
thiha ( "lion", from sīha)
zeya ( "victory", from jāya)
wunna ( "best", from kaung)

Burmese people who marry foreigners or move to countries that use surnames may use their name as if part of it represented a family name. For example, Tun Myint's wife changed her last name to Myint, but Myint is part of his personal name.

Honorifics

As above, honorifics supplement a given name, and can be the normal form of address used both in writing and in speech, especially with a name of one or two syllables. Widespread use of honorifics is found within all cultures in the Burmese region. Although some ethnic groups have special honorifics, these words are recognized and applied by other groups (rather than being translated).

For example, Aung San's parents are more generally known as U Pha and Daw Suu. These can be translated as "Mr. Pha" and "Ms. Suu" but are often used more informally.

Some common honorifics used in Burmese include:

 Ashin ( or ), Monks, nobles, and rarely, for women (e.g. Ashin Jinarakkhita)
 Binnya, Banya ( or ), To indicate royalty and nobility, from Mon  (e.g. Binnya U)
 Bo, Bogyoke ( or ), Military officers (e.g., Bogyoke Aung San)
 Baya/Phaya, used to address Buddha, kings, monks, bishops and high ranking members of royalty
 Daw, Mature women or women in a senior position (e.g. Daw Aung San Suu Kyi)
 Duwa, Kachin chiefs
 Gyi, As a suffix to show respect (e.g. Khin-gyi Pyaw)
 Khun (ခွန်), Shan men (of Kengtung ancestry; e.g., Khun Htun Oo) and Pa'O men
 Ko, Men of similar age (e.g., Ko Mya Aye)
 Ma, Young women or women of similar age
 Mahn, Kayin (Karen) men (e.g., Mahn Win Maung)
 Maung (abbr. Mg), To address a man younger than oneself, also commonly used as a prefix for the proper male name.
 Mi (မိ), Some young women, usually as a nickname (e.g., Mi Swe); Mon women
 Minh (မင်း), Mon boys; equivalent to Maung, from Mon 
 Nai (နိုင်), Mon men; equivalent to U (e.g., Nai Shwe Kyin), from Mon 
 Nang (နန်း), Shan women of nobility, from Shan 
 Naw, Karen (especially in S'gaw Karen) women
 Nant, Karen (especially in West Pwo Karen) women
 Nan (နန်း), Karen (especially in East Pwo Karen) women; Shan women
 Sai (စိုင်း), Shan men (e.g., Sai Htee Saing), from Shan 
 Salai (ဆလိုင်း), Chin men
 Sao (စဝ်), Shan royalty (e.g., Sao Shwe Thaik), from Shan 
 Saw (စော) Shan royalty (Burmanized form of Sao) (e.g., Saw Mon Hla); Karen men (especially in S'gaw Karen and East Pwo Karen) (e.g., Saw Bo Mya, Saw Hla Tun (the first chairman of Kayin State))
 Sa, Karen men (especially in West Pwo Karen)
 Sawbwa, Burmese approximation of Shan saopha, used as a suffix for Shan chiefs (e.g., Nyaungshwe Sawbwa Sao Shwe Thaik)
 Saya, Men of senior rank or age for civilian communities/ used for private, lance corporal, corporal in various armed organisations.
 Sayadaw, Senior monks (e.g., Sayadaw U Pandita)
 Sayama, Women of senior rank or age
 Shin ( or ), Monks and noble men and women (Archaic; e.g., Shin Arahan, Shin Ye Htut, Yawei Shin Htwe)
 Thamein, Burmanized form of Mon  used by Mon royalty (e.g., Smim Htaw)
 Thakin, Members of Dobama Asiayone, "the Thakins" (Archaic; e.g., Thakin Kodaw Hmaing)
 Theippan, Writers (Archaic; e.g., Theippan Maung Wa)
 U, Mature men or men in a senior position and monks (e.g., U Thant, U Nu)

Indexing
According to The Chicago Manual of Style, Burmese names are indexed by the first element unless this element is an honorific. Honorifics are mentioned after the other elements of the name, separated by a comma, or are not stated at all.

Astrology-based naming system

Many Burmese Buddhists also use astrology (which is determined by the child's day of birth in the traditional eight-day calendar) to name their children. For instance, a Monday-born child may have a name beginning with the letter "k". The following is a traditional chart that corresponds the day of birth with the first letter used in a child's name, although this naming scheme is not universally used today:

References

 
Name
Name
Names by culture